Romuald Kosieniak (born 20 April 1957 in Bydgoszcz) is a former Polish politician who was a 2nd Voivode of Kuyavian-Pomeranian Voivodeship (2001-2006) and Vice-Starosta of Bydgoszcz County (1998-2001).

He graduated AGH University of Science and Technology and Nicolaus Copernicus University in Toruń. He worked as geodesist. Since 1987 he worked in Bydgoszcz Voivodeship Office.

Between 1998 and 2001 he was a Vice-Starosta of Bydgoszcz County.

After appointed of Leszek Miller Cabinet, Kosieniak was nominated as Voivode of Kuyavian-Pomeranian Voivodeship (wojewoda kujawsko-pomorski). He was a Voivode between 20 October 2001 and 26 January 2006.

See also 
 Kuyavian-Pomeranian Voivodeship

References

External links 
 (pl) Kuyavian-Pomeranian Voivodeship Office webside

1957 births
Living people
Politicians from Bydgoszcz
Nicolaus Copernicus University in Toruń alumni
Voivodes of Kuyavian-Pomeranian Voivodeship